The knobcone pine, Pinus attenuata (also called Pinus tuberculata), is a tree that grows in mild climates on poor soils.  It ranges from the mountains of southern Oregon to Baja California with the greatest concentration in northern California and the Oregon-California border.

Description
Individual specimens can live up to a century. The crown is usually conical with a straight trunk. The bark is thin and smooth, flaky and gray-brown when young, becoming dark gray-red-brown and shallowly furrowed into flat scaly ridges in age. The twigs are red-brown and often resinous. Its wood is knotty and of little interest for lumber.

The scales end in a short stout prickle. Cones can sometimes be found attached to the trunk and larger branches.

Distribution
It forms nearly pure stands, preferring to grow where there is no competition.

Ecology
On the coast, the knobcone pine may hybridize with bishop pine (Pinus muricata), and Monterey pine (Pinus radiata).

In the western foothills of the Sierra Nevada, knobcone pine is often a co-dominant with  blue oak (Quercus douglasii).

The species is susceptible to fire, but this melts the cone resin, releasing seeds for regrowth. The species seems to be shade intolerant.

See also

 Coulter pine
 Pinus sabiniana

References

Further reading
 Bakker, Elna S. (1971). An island called California. University of California press (1972).

External links

 
 USDA Plants Profile: Pinus attenuata
 Virginia Tech Dendrology – Knobcone Pine
 

Pinus
Trees of the Southwestern United States
Trees of the Northwestern United States
Least concern flora of the United States
Trees of Baja California